Aero bar may refer to:

 Aero (chocolate), a chocolate candy bar 
 Aero bar for bicycles, a bicycle handle bar used for time trials or triathlons